Up is the debut album by English pop group Right Said Fred, released in 1992 on Charisma Records and Tug Recordings. The album contains the group's only United States Top 40 hit, "I'm Too Sexy", which was number one on the Billboard Hot 100 for three weeks in February 1992, and their only UK number-one hit "Deeply Dippy", which stayed in that position for three weeks from April to May 1992.

Up is Right Said Fred's only US album release to date, peaking at number 46 on the Billboard 200. It reached number one on the UK Albums Chart.

Critical reception
In addition to "I'm Too Sexy, Arion Berger from Entertainment Weekly stated that the Up album has "relentless hooks, more goofy catchphrases, and camp sensibility coming out of its ears." He highlighted ”No One on Earth”, ”Do Ya Feel” and ”Deeply Dippy”, adding, "If Martians tried to approximate Earth music by channeling frivolous Top 40 like ABBA’s, overwrought cabaret like Liza Minnelli’s, and smart disco like the Pet Shop Boys’, the result might sound like Up. How all this would go over on Mars is hard to say; down here, it’s good-bad disposable pop."

Track listing

Track listing as above on sleeve but actual DVD contains "Stick It Out" instead of "Hands Up for Lovers".

Personnel
Richard Fairbrass – lead vocals and backing vocals, bass
Fred Fairbrass – guitars and backing vocals
Rob Manzoli – electric guitar and backing vocals

with:

Phil Spalding – bass
TommyD – synthesizers, sampler, arranger, producer and backing vocals
Phil Taylor – piano
Malcolm Duncan – saxophone
Sid Gould – trombone
Neil Sidwell – trumpet
Chuck Sabo – drums
Jocelyn Brown – backing vocals
Lily D – backing vocals
Graham Bonnett – backing vocals, engineer
Massive Gut – backing vocals
Juliet Roberts – backing vocals
Nick Ingman – arranger and string arrangements
Ian Craig Marsh – programming
Brian Pugsley – programming
Technical
Guy Holmes – executive producer
John McDonnel – engineer
Ronen Tal – engineer
Donal – assistant engineer, assistant
Andy Houston – assistant engineer
Andy Smith – assistant engineer

Charts

Sales and certifications

References 

1992 debut albums
Right Said Fred albums
Charisma Records albums